Avdo Kalajdžić (born 23 May 1959) is a Bosnian professional football manager and former player who is the assistant manager of Bosnian Premier League club Velež Mostar.

He played for Velež Mostar and Bursaspor, making over 280 league appearances and scoring 13 goals. Kalajdžić won the 1980–81 and 1985–86 Yugoslav Cups with Velež.

As a manager, he was the caretaker manager of the Bosnia and Herzegovina national team for one match in 1999 and on three occasions held the manager role of Velež, from 1998 to 2000, in 2003 and in 2016. Since August 2019, Kalajdžić has been working as an assistant manager of Feđa Dudić in Velež.

Playing career
Born in SFR Yugoslavia, Kalajdžić started playing professional football for local side Velež Mostar. He would make over 200 Yugoslav First League appearances in a 10-year spell with the club. He also played for the sides that won the 1980–81 and 1985–86 Yugoslav Cup titles. 

In 1988, Kalajdžić moved to Turkey, joining Süper Lig side Bursaspor. He made 63 league appearances in two seasons with the club. In 1990, Kalajdžić decided to retire from playing at the age of only 31.

Managerial career
After retiring from playing, Kalajdžić became a football manager. In 1999, he was the caretaker manager of the Bosnia and Herzegovina national team and also managed Velež from 1998 to 2000, in 2003 and in 2016.

He worked as an assistant coach in the Bosnia and Herzegovina U21 national team from 2011 to 2012 and at Velež during 2014.

Kalajdžić also led the Velež Mostar U19 team from 2018 to 2019. In August 2019, he became the new assistant manager at Velež, working alongside assistant Mustafa Kodro and manager Feđa Dudić.

Honours

Player
Velež Mostar
Yugoslav Cup: 1980–81, 1985–86

References

External links
EX YU Fudbalska Statistika po godinama

1959 births
Living people
Sportspeople from Mostar
Association football defenders
Yugoslav footballers
FK Velež Mostar players
Bursaspor footballers
Yugoslav First League players
Süper Lig players
Yugoslav expatriate footballers
Expatriate footballers in Turkey
Yugoslav expatriate sportspeople in Turkey
Bosnia and Herzegovina footballers
Bosnia and Herzegovina football managers
FK Velež Mostar managers
Bosnia and Herzegovina national football team managers